The fantastic is a subgenre of literary works characterized by the ambiguous presentation of seemingly supernatural forces.

Bulgarian-French structuralist literary critic Tzvetan Todorov originated the concept, characterizing the fantastic as the hesitation of characters and readers when presented with questions about reality.

Definitions 
The fantastic is present in works where the reader experiences hesitation about whether a work presents what Todorov calls "the uncanny", wherein superficially supernatural phenomena turn out to have a rational explanation (such as in the Gothic works of Ann Radcliffe) or "the marvelous", where the supernatural is confirmed by the story. Todorov breaks down the fantastic into a manner of systems, filled with conditions and properties that make it easier to understand.

The fantastic requires the fulfillment of three conditions. First, the text must oblige the reader to consider the world of the characters as a world of living persons and to hesitate between a natural or supernatural explanation of the events described. Second, this hesitation may also be experienced by a character; thus the reader's role is so to speak entrusted to a character, and at the same time the hesitation is represented, it becomes one of the themes of the work—in the case of naive reading, the actual reader identifies himself with the character. Third, the reader must adopt a certain attitude with regard to the text:  he will reject allegorical as well as "poetic" interpretations.  The fantastic also explores three conditions; reader’s hesitation, hesitation may be felt by another character, and the reader must have a certain mindset when reading the text. There is also a system to the fantastic that he explores that uses three properties. The utterance which discusses the use of figurative discourse, how everything figurative is taken in a literal sense. The supernatural begins to exist within the fantastic due to exaggeration, figurative expression being taken literal, and how the supernatural originates from the rhetorical figure. Leading into the second property, the act of uttering. In this property, it is most connected to the narrator of the story and the idea (discourse-wise) is that the narrator/character must pass this "test of truth". The narrator is someone who cannot "lie"; they explain the supernatural (marvelous), but doubt in what they say creates the fantastic. The final property is the syntactic aspect. Penzoldt’s theory (see below) is what focuses on this property the most.

The fantastic can also represent dreams and wakefulness where the character or reader hesitates as to what is reality or what is a dream. Again the fantastic is found in this hesitation—once it is decided the Fantastic ends.

Rosemary Jackson builds onto and challenges Todorov's definition of the fantastic in her 1981 nonfiction book Fantasy: The Literature of Subversion. Jackson rejects the notion of the fantastic genre as a simple vessel for wish fulfillment that transcends human reality in worlds presented as superior to our own, instead positing that the genre is inseparable from real life, particularly the social and cultural contexts within which each work of the fantastic is produced. She writes that the "unreal" elements of fantastic literature are created only in direct contrast to the boundaries set by its time period’s "cultural order", acting to illuminate the unseen limitations of said boundaries by undoing and recompiling the very structures which define society into something "strange" and "apparently new". In subverting these societal norms, Jackson claims, the fantastic represents the unspoken desire for greater societal change. Jackson criticizes Todorov's theory as being too limited in scope, examining only the literary function of the fantastic, and expands his structuralist theory to fit a more cultural study of the genre—which, incidentally, she proposes is not a genre at all, but a mode that draws upon literary elements of both realistic and supernatural fiction to create the air of uncertainty in its narratives as described by Todorov. Jackson also introduces the idea of reading the fantastic through a psychoanalytical lens, referring primarily to Freud’s theory of the unconscious, which she believes is integral to understanding the fantastic’s connection to the human psyche.

There are however additional ways to view the fantastic, and often these differing perspectives come from differing social climates. In their introduction to The Female Fantastic: Gender and the Supernatural in the 1890s and 1920s, Lizzie Harris McCormick, Jennifer Mitchell, and Rebecca Soares describe how the social climate in the 1890s and 1920s allowed for a new era of "fantastic" literature to grow. Women were finally exploring the new freedoms given to them and were quickly becoming equals in society. The fear of the new women in society, paired with their growing roles, allowed them to create a new style of "fuzzy" supernatural texts. The fantastic is on the dividing line between supernatural and not supernatural, Just as during this time period the women were not respecting the boundary of inequality that had always been set for them. At the time, women's roles in society were very uncertain, just as the rules of the fantastic are never straight forward. This climate allowed for a genre similar to the social structure to emerge. The Fantastic is never purely supernatural, nor can the supernatural be ruled out. Just as women were not equal yet, but they were not completely oppressed. The Female Fantastic seeks to enforce this idea that nothing is certain in the fantastic nor the gender roles of the 1920s. Many women in this time period began to blur the lines between the genders, removing the binary out of gender and allowing for many interpretations. For the first time, women started to possess more masculine or queer qualities without it becoming as much of an issue. The fantastic during this time period reflects these new ideas by breaking parallel boundaries in the supernatural. The fantastic breaks this boundary by having the readers never truly know whether or not the story is supernatural.

Related genres 
There is no truly typical "fantastic story", as the term generally encompasses both works of the horror and gothic genres. Two representative stories might be:

 Algernon Blackwood's story "The Willows", where two men traveling down the Danube River are beset by an eerie feeling of malice and several improbable setbacks in their trip; the question that pervades the story is whether they are falling prey to the wilderness and their own imaginations, or if there really is something horrific out to get them.
Edgar Allan Poe's story "The Black Cat", where a murderer is haunted by a black cat; but is it revenge from beyond the grave, or just a cat?

There is no clear distinction between the fantastic and magic realism as neither privilege either realistic or supernatural elements. The former, in its hesitation between supernatural and realistic explanations of events, may task the reader with questioning the nature of reality and this may serve to distinguish the Fantastic from Magical Realism (in which magical elements are understood to constitute in part the reality of the protagonists and are not themselves questionable).

The fantastic is sometimes erroneously called the Grotesque or Supernatural fiction, because both the Grotesque and the Supernatural contain fantastic elements, yet they are not the same, as the fantastic is based on an ambiguity of those elements.

In Russian literature, the "fantastic" (фантастика) encompasses science fiction (called "science fantastic", научная фантастика), fantasy, and other non-realistic genres.

Examples

In literary works 
Many of Edgar Allan Poe's short works
Henry James, The Turn of the Screw – seen by Todorov as one of the few examples of pure Fantastic
Nikolai Gogol's "The Nose"
Mikhail Bulgakov
Mircea Eliade
Algernon Blackwood's The Willows and The Wendigo
Sheridan Le Fanu's works in In a Glass Darkly
Mervyn Peake's Gormenghast series
E.T.A. Hoffmann's works, notably "The Sandman", "The Golden Flower Pot", and "The Nutcracker and the King of Mice"
Gérard de Nerval's "Aurelia"
Guy de Maupassant's "The Horla"
Ambrose Bierce's The Death of Halpin Frayser
Adolfo Bioy Casares's The Invention of Morel
R.L. Stevenson's Strange Case of Dr. Jekyll and Mr. Hyde
Bram Stoker's Dracula
Mary Shelley's Frankenstein
Oscar Wilde's The Picture of Dorian Gray 
Emily Brontë's Wuthering Heights 
Charlotte Brontë's Jane Eyre
Franz Kafka's The Metamorphosis
Lewis Carroll's Alice's Adventures of Wonderland and Through the Looking Glass
Arthur Machen's The Great God Pan
Nathaniel Hawthorne's The House of the Seven Gables and "The Birth-Mark"
H.G. Wells's The Island of Doctor Moreau
Short stories in Vernon Lee's Hauntings

In film
Unbreakable (2000)

See also 
Fantastic art
Fantastique
Speculative fiction

Notes

Further reading 
Apter, T. E. Fantasy Literature: An Approach to Reality (Bloomington: Indiana University Press, 1982)
Armitt, Lucy, Theorising the Fantastic (London: Arnold, 1996)
Brooke-Rose, Christine A Rhetoric of the Unreal: Studies in Narrative and Structure, Especially of the Fantastic (Cambridge: Cambridge University Press, 1981)
Capoferro, Riccardo, Empirical Wonder: Historicizing the Fantastic, 1660-1760 (Bern: Peter Lang, 2010)
Cornwell, Neil, The Literary Fantastic: From Gothic to Postmodernism (New York: Harvester Wheatsheaf, 1990)
Jackson, Rosemary, Fantasy: The Literature of Subversion (London, Methuen, 1981)
Rabkin, Eric, The Fantastic in Literature (Princeton: Princeton University Press, 1975)
Sandner, David ed., Fantastic Literature: A Critical Reader (Westport, CT: Praeger, 2004)
Siebers, Tobin, The Romantic Fantastic (Ithaca: Cornell University Press, 1984)
Traill, Nancy, Possible Worlds of the Fantastic: The Rise of the Paranormal in Fiction (Toronto: University of Toronto Press, 1996)
McCormick, Lizzie Harris, Jennifer Mitchell, and Rebecca Soares, The Female Fantastic: Gender and the Supernatural in the 1890s and 1920s (Routledge, 2019) 

Speculative fiction

es:Fantástico